is a village located in Ibaraki Prefecture, Japan. , the village had an estimated population of 14,504 in 5907 households and a population density of 218 persons per km². The percentage of the population aged over 65 was 32.0%. The village holds one of the two Japan Racing Association's training centers (the other is in Ritto, Shiga).

Geography
Located in southern Ibaraki Prefecture, Miho is bordered by Lake Kasumigaura to the north and east.

Surrounding municipalities
Ibaraki Prefecture
 Inashiki
 Ami

Climate
Miho has a Humid continental climate (Köppen Cfa) characterized by warm summers and cool winters with light snowfall.  The average annual temperature in Miho is 13.9 °C. The average annual rainfall is 1344 mm with September as the wettest month. The temperatures are highest on average in August, at around 25.9 °C, and lowest in January, at around 3.1 °C.

Demographics
Per Japanese census data, the population of Miho peaked around the year 2000 and has declined since.

History
The villages of Kihara and Anju were created with the establishment of the modern municipalities system on April 1, 1889. The two villages were merged to form the village of Miho on April 1, 1955.

Government
Miho has a mayor-council form of government with a directly elected mayor and a unicameral village council of 12 members. Miho contributes one member to the Ibaraki Prefectural Assembly. In terms of national politics, the village is part of Ibaraki 6th district of the lower house of the Diet of Japan.

Economy
The economy of Miho is primarily agricultural, including aquaculture on Lake Kasumigaura.

Education
Miho has three public elementary schools and one public middle school operated by the village government. The village does not have public high school, but the Ibaraki Prefectural Board of Education operates a special education school for the handicapped..

Transportation

Railway
Miho does not have any passenger rail service.

Highway

Local attractions
Site of Kihara Castle
Akadaira Shell Midden

International relations
 – Lingui District, Guilin, Guangxi Zhuang Autonomous Region, China  (friendship city)

Noted people from Miho
Eijiro Ai, professional baseball player

References

External links

Official Website 

Villages in Ibaraki Prefecture
Miho, Ibaraki